Casey Thomas Jennings (born July 10, 1975) is an American beach volleyball player. He teams up with Kevin Wong and has teamed up with Brad Keenan or Matt Fuerbringer during most of his career. He married Kerri Walsh, a beach volleyball player with three gold and one bronze Olympic medals, in 2005.

Personal life
Jennings, the youngest of 5 brothers, was born in Las Vegas, Nevada. He received a degree in Sociology from Brigham Young University. Casey is a practicing Mormon.

Jennings married Hilary Clark on June 5, 1999, and filed for divorce on November 17, 2000. Reasons for the divorce were not disclosed.

On December 4, 2005, he married Olympic Gold Medalist Kerri Walsh in Palm Springs, California, where many AVP players were in attendance. He gave her a ring inscribed with "My Six Feet of Sunshine," a nickname Kerri was given when they first met. On December 3, 2008, Walsh announced to Access Hollywood that she and her husband were expecting their first child and that the baby might have been conceived in Beijing. On May 22, 2009, Walsh gave birth to son Joseph Michael Jennings in Los Angeles.  Jennings and Walsh live in Redondo Beach, California. On May 19, 2010, Walsh delivered their second son, Sundance Thomas Jennings. On April 6, 2013, Walsh delivered the couple's first daughter, Scout Margery, with whom she was five weeks pregnant when she won her third gold medal at the London Olympics.

Career
During his years at Brigham Young University, Jennings was a member of the 1999 NCAA National Championship team. He and his former partner, Matt Fuerbringer, captured their first victory at Belmar, New Jersey in 2004.

Jennings along with partner Kevin Wong successfully ended the 2010 season by capturing gold at the Swatch FIVB World Tour by beating the Brazilian duo of Benjamin Insfran and Bruno Schmidt at The Hague, Netherlands.

References

External links
 
 
 

1975 births
Living people
BYU Cougars men's volleyball players
People from the Las Vegas Valley
American men's beach volleyball players
Sportspeople from Redondo Beach, California